Wilmington School District 209-U is a school district located in Wilmington, Illinois, U.S.A., in Will County.  Matt Swick is the district's superintendent.

The district operates the following schools:
Wilmington High School
Stevens Intermediate School (Grades 2 through 5)
Bruning Elementary School (Pre-Kindergarten, Kindergarten, and Grade 1)
Wilmington Middle School (Grades 6 through 8)

References

External links

School districts in Will County, Illinois